Djifer is a coastal village in Fatick Department in Fatick Region, Senegal. It is located 10 km south of Palmarin at the end of the Point of Sangomar.

Climate
Djifer has a hot semi-arid climate (Köppen BSh) with no rainfall from November to May and moderate to heavy rainfall from June to October.

References

 Villages in Senegal
Populated places in Fatick Region